The  or  (Dutch) is an urban public park in Brussels, Belgium. It is linked to the rest of the municipality by the Avenue Louise/Louizalaan, which was built in 1861, at the same time the park was laid out.

The park consists of two large, slightly oval parts. The northern part is the most wooded and is home to some 19th-century buildings. The southern part comprises a  large artificial lake with an island in its centre, called Robinson Island, home to the Chalet Robinson.

History

Early history
In 1840, it was given its current name after the abbey.

On 17 June 1815, on the eve of the Battle of Waterloo, English soldiers played a cricket match on a ground located in the area currently covered by the park. Ever since, this area has been called  ("The Englishmen's Lawn"), although few are aware of the name. In 1965, the then British Ambassador in Belgium planted an oak tree and unveiled a bronze plaque to commemorate the 150th anniversary of this sporting and historical event.

19th-century development

The condition was that two-thirds of the trees would be preserved and a  zone around the park would remain undeveloped. The decision was prompted by the popularity of the place among well-to-do walkers, who were increasingly less fond of the industrialising / in northern Brussels.

His project, relating to English landscaping, was characterised by an irregularity in the plantations and roads, by alternating massifs and clearances allowing beautiful visual escapes, and by the creation of picturesque scenes. The park, property of the Belgian State since 1843, was granted through a royal decree issued on 21 April 1864 to the City of Brussels, which is responsible for its development and maintenance.

In 1866, the park, largely landscaped, was open to the public and aroused considerable enthusiasm. The place quickly became a popular recreational area for the people of Brussels, comparable to the Bois de Boulogne in Paris. In addition to its many promenades, it hosted a dairy, a velodrome, a theatre, an artificial boating lake, as well as a racecourse. Queen Marie-Henriette, wife of King Leopold II, often went riding in the park. The horsemen's battle bronze sculptural group at the entrance is the work of the Anglo-Belgian sculptor Jacques de Lalaing.

20th and 21st centuries
With the rise of motorised traffic in the early 20th century, the Bois de la Cambre's avenues were increasingly turned into thoroughfares fragmenting the park. The park was protected as a landscape in 1976 and was designated a special protection zone within the framework of Natura 2000 in 2004. Since 1985, it has also hosted a cycling event every spring for scout groups; the 24 heures vélo du bois de la Cambre.

Nowadays, the question of the park's closure to motorised traffic is regularly raised. The main road around the lake has been closed to traffic on Saturdays and Sundays since the 1990s. In April 2012, a new mobility plan, drawn up at the request of the City of Brussels, proposed a partial closure of the park to motorists, and the requalification of the public space for cyclists and pedestrians. In March 2020, traffic was temporarily banned from the park due to the COVID-19 pandemic in Belgium. At the end of May, cars were allowed again in its northern part. As of 14 December 2020, a new traffic plan has been in effect with access for cars in the northern and southern parts on weekdays, and only in the northern part on Saturdays and during school holidays. The park is car-free on Sundays.

The Chalet Robinson
In 1877, the Chalet Robinson, a tea-room café designed in picturesque Swiss chalet style, was built on the lake's island, known as Robinson Island. The chalet was twice destroyed by fire; the first time in 1896, and the second time in 1991. The decision was made in 2006 to rebuild it and it reopened to the public in September 2009. An electrical ferry boat links the island to the shores of the lake.

Gallery

See also

 List of parks and gardens in Brussels
 Square du Bois

References

Notes

Bibliography

External links

Parks in Brussels
Urban public parks
City of Brussels